Ngan Lok Fung (born 26 January 1993 in Hong Kong) is a Hong Kong professional footballer who plays as a central midfielder for Hong Kong Premier League club Lee Man.

Club career
Ngan joined the Kitchee's youth team when he was 13 years old. He helped the team to win the champions of Nike Premier Cup U-15 section, as well as being named the Most Valuable Player of the tournament. Since then, he featured in some Reserves match for Kitchee as a youth team player. He was promoted to the first team before the start of 2011–12 season. On 3 September 2011, he featured in the first match of the season as a starter. However, he was substituted after the first half. He was loaned to Pegasus to gain experience in July 2012 until the end of the year. During the loan spell, he featured in two league games for Pegasus. On 17 June 2013, he joined fellow First Division club Southern on a season-long loan. 

On 17 July 2017, it was revealed that Lee Man had acquired Ngan on loan for the 2017–18 season. His contract expired at the end of the season and he was not retained by Kitchee. 

On 17 July 2018, Lee Man reacquired the services of Ngan for the upcoming 2018–19 season.

Personal life
Ngan graduated from the Chinese University of Hong Kong in 2017 with a degree in sports science.

Career statistics

Club
 As of 23 February 2013

International
As of international matches last played 24 September 2022

Honours

Club
Lee Man
 Hong Kong Sapling Cup: 2018–19

References

External links
 
 

1993 births
Living people
Hong Kong First Division League players
Hong Kong Premier League players
Hong Kong footballers
Kitchee SC players
TSW Pegasus FC players
Association football midfielders
Southern District FC players
Hong Kong international footballers
Yuen Long FC players
Lee Man FC players